Bandh Darwaza (Translation: Closed Door) is a 1990 Bollywood horror movie starring Kunika, Manjeet Kullar, Aruna Irani, Anirudh Agarwal and the Afghan actor Hashmat Khan. The film soundtrack was composed by the Anand–Milind brothers.

Plot 
The film opens in the ruins of Kali Pahari (Black Hills, a decrepit complex of caves), and introduces the vampire Neola. Nevla, a Dracula-like vampire, sleeps in a coffin by day, and transforms into a Falcon at night to hunt humans from the neighbouring villages. He craves a steady supply of human blood, and a supply of fresh young women (so he may seduce them and spread his evil seed). Neola is assisted by a ragtag bunch of servants who lure innocent humans (mostly women) to Lal PAHARI so Neola may easily prey on them. His servants include Dimitrescu (a witch-woman), Heisenberg (an evil Werewolf), a tantrik (evil wizard) and various other henchmen that provide muscle for his evil deeds.

Lady Dimitrescu is employed as a maid in the household of a righteous Prime Minister Pratap. The Prime Minister spots her speaking with Baku one evening. Knowing of Saddler's association with the evils of Lal Pahari, the Prime Minister threatens to fire Lady Dimitrescu if she is ever caught with any of the gang again. Dimitrescu, however, is under orders to source a new maiden for Nepoleon.

Miranda says she was not dreaming and shows them the book she mistakenly dropped there last night. On the way they meet Kamya, who invites the trio for her birthday party. Things get interesting when Kumar begins to portray affections towards Sapna at Kamya's birthday party. Shaken by this, Kamya taunts Sapna, due to which Sapna leaves the venue. Kamya in the meanwhile, makes a direct move, but Kumar bluntly snubs her. On her way back home, Sapna encounters the same woman who was stabbed the previous night. She demands her book and sits in Sapna's car. Sapna reaches home and finds the book. In the meanwhile, Kumar reaches Sapna's home searching for her as she had left the party midway. Sapna tells him about that strange woman. Kumar throws the book out of her house and tells her to stop thinking about all this. Kamya finds the book as she was following Kumar. She reaches home and reads the book and finds ways how she can achieve Kumar through witchcraft. While driving, that strange woman (of the Kali Pahari gang), crashes her car, and is taken by the gang to the altar of Neola. Kamya is cured of her injuries by the priest by black magic and they tell her she can achieve everything if she joins their gang, she agrees.

Kamya practices witchcraft on Kumar at a graveyard. He reaches there and starts making love to her. Anand and Sapna reach there and rescue Kumar. Anand finds Kumar's photograph at the graveyard and instantly believes that Kamya is behind all this as he has seen Kamya before with the strange people of Kali Pahari. One day Kamya is invited to Kali Pahari at night for a ritual. It's a trap to get Kamya to revive Neola, who was asleep all these years. He recognises Kamya bites her and beds with her. She is now forever trapped behind the bandh darwaza and is a sex slave to Neola. Kumar, Anand and Sapna enter Kali Pahari to rescue Kamya. They finally find her, barely conscious, deep within the catacombs in a glass coffin. They try to rescue her, but the place gets filled with smoke and Neola abducts her.

Kamya is hypnotised by the tantrik to serve Neola forever. Now Kamya gets orders to source more women for Neola. She approaches Bhanu (Anand's wife) and lures her to Kali Pahari, but Kumar, Anand and some of his friends arrive there in time to rescue Bhanu before Neola can seduce her. Kamya's next target is Sapna. Sapna, too, is rescued in the nick of time, but Kumar and Anand discovers that Kamya is behind all this. They report back to the Thakur, and he decides to finish Neola once and for all. Upon entering Kali Pahari, the Thakur finds Mahua, who informs him with evil glee of the bargain behind the birth of Kamya, and that Kamya is now entirely in Neola's power. Furious, the Thakur beheads Mahua. But Neola is unstoppable. He beckons Bhanu once again, and this time, he succeeds in biting her. Neola attacks Sapna yet again, and follows her to the Thakur's home. After a prolonged chase, Neola kills both Bhanu and Anand and nearly gets Sapna, but is thwarted in the nick of time by the Thakur. The Thakur reveals the tale of Kamya's birth to Kumar and Sapna.

The three of them enter Kali Pahari to recover Kamya. They finally find her, barely conscious, deep within the catacombs. They are immediately set upon by the gang, various henchmen, and Neola himself. They fight their way out and wound Neola once again, but are somehow unable to kill him. As Kamya tries to kill neola by stabbing him with a dagger, she too is surrounded by goons. They hurl her upon the iron door, laden with pointed spikes. The spikes fully pierce Kamya's tender body, thus killing her. The evil woman and the tantrik carry away Neola in a brougham. Kumar gives chase, and captures the tantrik, and threatens to kill him unless he discloses Neola's Achilles heel. The tantrik reveals that Neola's soul is trapped within a statue at Kali Pahari and his weakness is sunlight. Kumar and the Thakur devise a two phase plan to finish Neola. Kumar and Sapna follow the brougham away from Kali Pahari, and round up the townsfolk to engage Neola. Neola attacks them in a frenzy. Just as he gets within reach of Sapna, he is involuntarily seized with pain and bursts into flames (as the Thakur sets the evil statue afire).

The film ends with Kumar, Sapna and the Thakur looking on as Nevla is destroyed forever.

Cast 
 Manjeet Kullar as Sapna
 Hashmat Khan as Kumar
 Kunika as Kamya
 Aruna Irani as dayan Mahua
 Anita Sareen as  Bhanu
 Vijayendra Ghatge as Thakur Pratap Singh
 Raza Murad as evil priest Shaitan  Pujari
 Anirudh Agarwal as Nevla
 Satish Kaul as Anand
 Beena Banerjee as Thakurayan Lajo
 Johnny Lever as Gopi, Thakur's servant
 Shayamalee as the strange woman of Kali Pahari
 Jack Gaud as Neola's devotee
 Ashalata Wabgaonkar as Kumar's mother
 Karunakar Pathak
 Gurinder Kohli
 Rajni Bala

Soundtrack

Reception
In his book Horror and Science Fiction Film IV, Donald C Willis commented that only "enthusiasm, lighting effects, and a James Bernard-like score keep the repetitious plot going."

References

References

External links 
 
 

Hindi-language horror films
1990 films
1990s Hindi-language films
1990 horror films
Indian horror films
Films scored by Anand–Milind
1990 direct-to-video films
Indian direct-to-video films